The 2013 Novak Djokovic tennis season officially commenced on 31 December 2012 with the start of the 2013 ATP World Tour.

Yearly summary
Novak Djokovic began the 2013 season in Australia. Alongside Ana Ivanovic, he represented Serbia at the 2013 Hopman Cup, where he played four singles and four mixed doubles matches. The Serbian duo finished runner-up, losing 1–2 to Spanish duo Anabel Medina Garrigues and Fernando Verdasco in the final. Two weeks later Djokovic took part in the first competitive tournament of the year – 2013 Australian Open as the two-time defending champion. On the road to the final Novak defeated Stanislas Wawrinka in an epic five-hour meeting that finished 12–10 in the decisive set. Along the way, he defeated two Top 10 players – Tomáš Berdych and David Ferrer. In the final he met the No. 3 seed Andy Murray, whom he defeated in four sets to take his third straight title at Melbourne Park, the first man in the open era to do so.

The following week, Djokovic represented his country in 2013 Davis Cup and helped Serbia to beat Belgium 3–2, winning his only match against Olivier Rochus in straight sets.

At the end of the month Novak took part in the 2013 Dubai Tennis Championships, which he won without dropping a single set. In the final he defeated Berdych, winning his fourth Dubai title and maintaining a 100 percent start to the season.

After the short break Djokovic headed to the United States, where traditionally the first two Masters tournaments are played. In Indian Wells, Novak was eliminated in the semifinals by Juan Martín del Potro and in Miami, he lost surprisingly in the fourth round to Tommy Haas. Djokovic remained in the USA and won two singles matches against John Isner and Sam Querrey in the Davis Cup Quarterfinal, clinching the place for Serbia in autumn semifinal against Canada.

Next Djokovic took part in European Clay Court Season, where he played in four tournaments, aiming to capture the 2013 French Open at the end. For the first time in his career he won the Monaco Masters, defeating eight-time defending champion Rafael Nadal in the final. Djokovic was unsuccessful in the following events, losing in second round in Madrid and in the quarterfinals of Rome to Grigor Dimitrov and Berdych respectively. In Roland Garros he missed the opportunity to complete the Career Grand Slam after losing an epic five-set semifinal to Nadal, who eventually won the title.

After a two-week break Novak entered the Wimbledon Championships, where he played much better than in the previous tournaments on clay. He reached the final without dropping a set in the first five matches and won a tight meeting with del Potro, the meeting lasting almost five hours and being the longest semifinal in Wimbledon history. However, two days later Djokovic was not able to threaten Murray despite leading in the second and third set and having saved three championship points. He lost in straight sets, for the first time since 2010.

Novak then started a four-week break and started the North American Hard Court season at the beginning of August, aiming to stay at the top of ATP ranking.
At the Rogers Cup, he came attempting to win his third consecutive Canadian Open at the Montreal edition. Although he defeated Gasquet in a rematch of the 2012 final in what he called almost perfect play, he lost a close 7–6 third set tiebreak to nemesis Rafael Nadal in the semis, ending his hard court winning streak against Nadal.

Djokovic reached the quarterfinals at Cincinnati but lost to Isner 7–5 in a third set. Djokovic then lost in the US Open final in four sets to Nadal. Since then Djokovic won Beijing against Nadal in straight sets, Shanghai against del Potro and Paris against Ferrer. At the ATP World Tour Finals, Djokovic retained the trophy, beating Nadal in straight sets.

All matches
This table chronicles all the matches of Djokovic in 2013, including walkovers (W/O) which the ATP does not count as wins. They are marked ND for non-decision or no decision.

Singles matches

Source

Doubles matches

Source

Hopman Cup

Exhibitions

Mubadala World Tennis Championship

Boodles Challenge

Tournament schedule

Singles schedule

2012 source
2013 source

Doubles schedule

2012 source
2013 source

Yearly records

Head-to-head matchups
Novak Djokovic has a  record against players from the top 10, a  record against other players from the top 50 and  record against other players outside the top 50.

Ordered by number of wins
(Bolded number marks a top 10 player at the time of match, Italic means top 50)

  Stanislas Wawrinka 4–0
  Tomáš Berdych 4–1
  Juan Martín del Potro  4–1
  Richard Gasquet 3–0
  Fabio Fognini 3–0
  Sam Querrey 3–0
  Rafael Nadal 3–3
  Roger Federer 2–0
  David Ferrer 2–0
  David Goffin 2–0
  Florian Mayer 2–0
  Juan Mónaco 2–0
  Lukas Rosol 2–0
  Radek Štěpánek 2–0
  Jo-Wilfried Tsonga 2–0
  Mikhail Youzhny 2–0
  Grigor Dimitrov 2–1
  Tommy Haas 2–1
  John Isner 2–1
  Roberto Bautista-Agut 1–0
  Benjamin Becker 1–0
  Ricardas Berankis 1–0
  Jérémy Chardy 1–0
  Somdev Devvarman 1–0
  Alexandr Dolgopolov 1–0
  Marcel Granollers 2–0
  Ryan Harrison  1–0
  Pierre-Hugues Herbert 1–0
  Denis Istomin 1–0
  Philipp Kohlschreiber 1–0
  Paul-Henri Mathieu 1–0
  Albert Montañés 1–0
  Jarkko Nieminen 1–0
  Guido Pella 1–0
  Vasek Pospisil 1–0
  Milos Raonic 1–0
  Bobby Reynolds 1–0
  Olivier Rochus 1–0
  Andreas Seppi 1–0
  Joao Sousa 1–0
  Viktor Troicki 1–0
  Fernando Verdasco 1–0
  Andy Murray 1–1

Finals

Singles: 9 (7–2)

Team competitions: 2 (0–2)

Earnings

 Figures in United States dollars (USD) unless noted.

See also
 2013 ATP World Tour
 2013 Roger Federer tennis season
 2013 Rafael Nadal tennis season
 2013 Andy Murray tennis season

References

External links
  
 ATP tour profile

Novak Djokovic tennis seasons
Djokovic
2013 in Serbian sport